(Latin: "Verses on Chess"), also known as the Einsiedeln Poem in some literature, is the title given to a 10th century Medieval Latin poem about chess. It is the first known European text to provide a technical description of chess for didactic purposes and it is considered a fundamental document to understand the development of chess in Europe.

Background
It was found on two manuscripts (Codex Einsidlensis 365 and 319) from Einsiedeln Abbey Library (where they are also currently preserved) located in Einsiedeln, Canton of Schwyz, Switzerland and it was dated to about AD 1000. The dating of the document makes the poem the earliest known reference to chess in a European text, as well as the earliest known document to mention the chess queen (called  in Latin), and the first reference to a bicolor board with dark and light colors (a pattern that was absent from boards in precursors such as Indian chaturanga and Perso-Arabic shatranj, both of which were single-color and were divided only by horizontal and vertical lines). 

The poem occupies both written sides of a sheet, and was only extracted in 1839 by the then abbey archivist Gall Morel (1803-1872) who combined it together with other loose sheets to form a composite volume, catalogued in the abbey archives as "Einsiedeln 365". In 1877, professor and classical philologist Hermann Hagen (1844-1898) made the verses accessible to the general public in his medieval poetry compilation . In 1913, the English chess historian H. J. R. Murray (1868-1955) translated, printed, and interpreted the verses. However, it was not until 1954 that historian H.M. Gamer drew attention to their extraordinary historical importance. There exists, in addition, an early medieval copy (though not of the Codex Einsidlensis 365) of lines 65 to 98 with a somewhat more classical orthography, which is dated to 997 AD and is also preserved in the Einsiedeln Abbey Library.

The poem most likely dates to the 10th century. Gamer (1954) argues that the text in Codex Einsidlensis 365 might date to shortly before AD 1000, and the one in Codex Einsidlensis 319 dates to about the same time, or possibly to a few years after AD 1000. The text in  Codex Einsidlensis 319 is incomplete, and entitled .

Content

The poem itself consists of 98 lines in elegiac couplets and written in Medieval Latin. The first ten verses justify the game as mental recreation, in which there is no malice, no perjurious fraud, and no physical risk, underlining also the advantage of playing without dice. Thus, the poem begins by expressing praise for the game of chess as a unique game that did not require gambling or dice. According to some chess historians, this initial statement was made in order to oppose common religious disapproval of games of chance that involved gambling. 

In the next ten verses the alternative coloring of the squares on the board is mentioned for the first time, not yet in general use but used by some players as a simple yet advantageous invention to better calculate the moves, besides giving players the ability to discover, more easily, mistakes or false moves. Between verses 21-44 the two sides, red and white, are described, together with the pieces. The movement of the pieces as well as the main regulatory conditions of the game are near identical to shatranj (Perso-Arabic chess), except for the pawn-promotion rule. From the poetic descriptions of the pieces and their movements, it can be interpreted that the movements differ from modern chess and can be summarized as follows:

 (king): It can move to any adjacent square. Unlike other pieces, it can never be captured, but when it's under attack and surrounded so that it can no longer move, the game comes to an end.
 (queen): It can move only to a diagonal adjacent square, making it the second weakest piece.
 (knight): It can move to the third square of a different color, two steps straight ahead, then one step on the diagonal.
If it reaches the eighth row then it's allowed to move like the queen but only if the original queen is out of the board.

According to chess historian H. J. R. Murray: 

The most striking feature of this rather tedious poem is its freedom from Arabic terminology. The words check and mate are not used, and it is only the name of the game, scachi, in the title, and the word rochus that show that the writer is dealing with a game that is not of European invention. The nomenclature of the game is drawn from that of the state, and not from that of the army.

See also
History of chess
Chess in early literature
Scachs d'amor, a 15th-century Valencian poem containing the earliest documented chess game with the modern rules (i.e. queen and bishop movements)

Notes

References

 Hermann Hagen (1877). Carmina medii aevi maximam partem inedita, Bern, pp. 137–141.
 H. J. R. Murray (1913). A History of Chess, (Oxford University Press)
 Helena M. Gamer, "The Earliest Evidence of Chess in Western Literature: The Einsiedeln Verses," Speculum, Vol. 29, No. 4. (October 1954), pp. 734–750.

External links
 Versus de Scachis: When Chess Reached Europe: Analysis and English prose translation of the poem by Peter Hulse.

History of chess
Poems about chess
Medieval chess
Medieval Latin poetry
10th-century poems
10th-century Latin books
10th-century Latin writers